The 2014 NXT TakeOver was the inaugural NXT TakeOver professional wrestling livestreaming event produced by WWE. It was held exclusively for wrestlers from the promotion's developmental territory, NXT. The event aired exclusively on the WWE Network and took place on May 29, 2014, at NXT's home arena, Full Sail University in Winter Park, Florida.

Five matches were contested during the main broadcast and one match prior to the televised portion of the show. The main event was the first high-profile NXT Championship defense in Adrian Neville's title reign after winning the championship at NXT Arrival as he wrestled Tyson Kidd. In another prominent match, the tournament finals for the vacant NXT Women's Championship was contested as Charlotte defeated Natalya to win the title.

Production

Background
In 2012, WWE restructured their NXT brand from being a reality-based competition television show to a developmental territory for their main roster. In February 2014, the promotion held its first live special for NXT that was uniquely titled Arrival, which was also the very first event to air live on WWE's online streaming service, the WWE Network, which launched earlier that same month. The promotion scheduled their next WWE Network event for NXT as an event called TakeOver. It was scheduled to be held on May 29, 2014, at NXT's home arena, Full Sail University in Winter Park, Florida.

Storylines
The card comprised five matches. The matches resulted from scripted storylines, where wrestlers portrayed heroes, villains, or less distinguishable characters that built tension and culminated in a wrestling match or series of matches. Results were predetermined by WWE's writers on the NXT brand, while storylines were produced on their weekly television program, NXT.

Event
The commentators were Tom Phillips, William Regal and Byron Saxton. The pre-show panel consisted of Christian, Paul Heyman and Renee Young.

Preliminary matches
The first match saw Adam Rose face Camacho. Rose executed a "Party Foul" on Camacho to win the match.

Next, The Ascension (Konnor and Viktor) defended the NXT Tag Team Championship against Kalisto and El Local. Viktor pinned El Local after the "Fall of Man" to retain the title.

After that, Sami Zayn faced Tyler Breeze to determine the #1 contender to the NXT Championship. During the match, Zayn executed a "Blue Thunder Bomb" on Breeze for a near-fall. Breeze executed a "Supermodel Kick" on Zayn for a near-fall. In the end, as Zayn attempted a "Helluva Kick" on Breeze, Breeze executed a "Beauty Shot" to win the match.

There was a segment with Mojo Rawley confronting Rusev and Lana; Rusev dominated the resultant brawl.

In the penultimate match, Charlotte (accompanied by her father, Ric Flair) faced Natalya (accompanied by WWE Hall of Famer Bret Hart) for the vacant NXT Women's Championship. During the match, Natalya applied the sharpshooter on Charlotte, who countered into the "Figure-Eight Leglock", which Natalya would counter. Charlotte applied the sharpshooter on Natalya but Natalya escaped. Charlotte pinned Natalya after "Natural Selection" to win the title.

Main event
In the main event, Adrian Neville  defended the NXT Championship against Tyson Kidd. During the match, Neville executed a pop-up sitout powerbomb on Kidd for a near-fall. Kidd performed a springboard "Blockbuster" on Neville for a near-fall. Kidd applied the sharpshooter on Neville and transitioned into the "Dungeon Lock", with Neville touching the ropes to break the hold. In the end, Neville executed a super hurricanrana and a "Red Arrow" on Kidd to retain the title.

Aftermath
With the scheduling of NXT TakeOver: Fatal 4-Way in September 2014, the "TakeOver" name would subsequently be used as the brand name for NXT's live shows. The TakeOver events were held several times a year, often as support shows for one of WWE's main shows, such as WrestleMania or SummerSlam. The events were originally exclusive to the WWE Network until TakeOver 31 in October 2020 when they also became available on traditional pay-per-view (PPV). The TakeOver series came to an end in 2021 with the final TakeOver held as TakeOver 36 in August that year. In September 2021, the NXT brand went through a restructuring, being rebranded as "NXT 2.0", reverting, in part, to a developmental territory for WWE. It was speculated that with this rebranding, the TakeOver series would be discontinued. On November 9, 2021, NXT's next PPV and livestreaming event was announced as WarGames. While WarGames had been held as a TakeOver event from 2017 to 2020, the announcement confirmed that the 2021 event would not be a TakeOver event, thus ending the TakeOver series. However, the Mat Man Podcast reported that WWE may use the TakeOver name again if an NXT event is held in a large venue, such as sharing the same venue with one of WWE's major events, and held as a support show for one of those events, like several previous TakeOvers have done.

Results

NXT Women's Championship Tournament (2014) 
On April 24, 2014, Paige was stripped of the NXT Women's Championship, by NXT's commissioner John Bradshaw Layfield, because she couldn't defend both the NXT Women's and WWE Divas Championship, ending her reign at 308 days. Right after, during the tapings for the May shows, a tournament was announced to take place to determine the next champion. Charlotte defeated Natalya at NXT Takeover on May 29, 2014 to become the new champion.

References 

Takeover
2014 in professional wrestling in Florida
2014 WWE Network events
Events in Florida
Professional wrestling in Winter Park, Florida
May 2014 events in the United States